Lao An (born August 16, 1929) is a retired Chinese business executive who once served as vice chairwoman of the China International Engineering Consulting Corporation. She is the wife of former Chinese Premier Zhu Rongji.

Biography
Lao was born in Changsha, Hunan, on August 16, 1929, to Lao Shaoji, president of Changsha Branch of Fuxing Bank, and Hu Womei. Her uncle Hu Yanling was an entrepreneur. She has a brother named Lao Tefu. During the Second Sino-Japanese War, she studied at Dongkou National No.8 Middle School, where she met her future husband Zhu Rongji. Lao graduated from Tsinghua University.

Personal life
Lao was married to Zhu Rongji in 1956 in Changsha, Hunan. They have a son, Zhu Yunlai, and a daughter, Zhu Yanlai.

References

1929 births
Living people
People from Changsha
Tsinghua University alumni
Spouses of national leaders
Businesspeople from Hunan